Marco Scacchi (ca. 1600 – 7 September 1662) was an Italian composer and writer on music.

Scacchi was born in Gallese, Lazio.  He studied under Giovanni Francesco Anerio in Rome. He was associated with the court at Warsaw from 1626, and was kapellmeister there from 1628 to 1649. His 1643 treatise Cribrum musicum accused Paul Siefert of having poor technique, leading to a war of words which lasted years. He then returned to Italy after falling ill, where he concentrated on writing about music theory. Scacchi believed that each genre of music should have its own unique style, and he devised his own system of classifying works which proved influential on later generations; Angelo Berardi quoted him at length in his 1687 treatise Documenti armonici.

Scacchi was a prolific composer, who wrote masses, madrigals, and sacred concertos. Nearly all of his stage works have been lost.  He died in Gallese.

Theoretical works
Cribrum musicum ad triticum Siferticum, seu Examinatio succinta psalmorum ... Venetiis: Alessandro Vincenti, 1643
Lettera per maggiore informatione a chi leggerà il mio 'Cribrum''' Venice, 1644; lost, survives in two manuscript transcriptionsJudicium cribri musici Warsaw c1649; lost, manuscript transcription in the Civico Museo Bibliografico Musicale Giovanni Battista Martini, BolognaBreve discorso sopra la musica moderna, di Marco Scacchi romano, maestro di cappella del serenissimo & potentissimo Giovanni Casimiro rè di Polonia & Svetia, ... '' Warszawa: Peter Elert 1649

References

External links

Italian Baroque composers
Italian Baroque
1600s births
1662 deaths
Italian male classical composers
Italian music critics
Italian music theorists
17th-century Italian composers
17th-century Italian writers
17th-century Italian male writers
Writers about music
17th-century male musicians